Christian Scott (born March 31, 1983), known professionally as Chief Xian aTunde Adjuah (formerly Christian Scott aTunde Adjuah), is an American jazz trumpeter, multi instrumentalist, composer, and producer. 

He has been nominated for six Grammy Awards, is a two-time Edison Award winner, the recipient of the JazzFM Innovator/Innovation of the year Award in 2016, Jazz Journalist Trumpeter of the Year, The Herb Alpert Award in the arts, and The Changing Worlds Peace Maker Award. Adjuah is the grandson of Big Chief Donald Harrison Sr. and Grand Griot of New Orleans and Guardians Institute founder Herreast Harrison, the nephew of jazz saxophonist Donald Harrison Jr., and is a chieftain of the Xodokan Nation of the maroon tribes of New Orleans.

Early life

Christian Scott was born on March 31, 1983, in New Orleans, Louisiana, to Cara Harrison and Clinton Scott III. He has a twin brother, writer-director Kiel Adrian Scott. Beginning at the age of 12, he was tutored by his uncle, jazz alto saxophonist Donald Harrison Jr. By 14, he was accepted into the New Orleans Center for Creative Arts (NOCCA), where he studied jazz under the guidance of program directors Clyde Kerr, Jr. and Kent Jordan. At 16, Scott was introduced by Harrison Jr. to the recording world via "Paradise Found" and "Kind of New" after joining his uncle's quintet.

Upon graduating from NOCCA, Adjuah received a scholarship to attend Berklee College of Music in Boston, Massachusetts, where he graduated in 2004 completing his studies in under 30 months. In 2002, while attending Berklee he started Impromp2 records and released his first recording "Christian Scott". Between 2003 and 2004, while attending Berklee, he was a member of the Berklee Monterey Quartet, recorded as part of the Pat Metheny and Gary Burton-led Art:21 student cooperative quintet, and studied under the direction of Charlie Lewis, Dave Santoro, and Gary Burton. He majored in professional music with a concentration in film scoring.

Adjuah was signed to Concord Music in 2005.

Career

Adjuah's major label debut album Rewind That (2006) was released with Concord Records. It received a Grammy nomination for Best Contemporary Jazz Album.

Adjuah was placed in Ebony Magazine's 30 Young Leaders Under 30 in 2007.

In 2005 Adjuah was featured on singer Nnenna Freelon's Grammy nominated "Blueprint of a Lady".

In 2012 his first double record was released.

Since 2002, Adjuah has released 13 studio albums and three live recordings. In 2016, Scott appeared on the public television series Articulate.

2010 saw the release of Yesterday You Said Tomorrow and the naissance of Adjuah's "Stretch Music" concept. NPR raved "Christian Scott Ushers In New Era Of Jazz". Scott received the first Edison Award in 2010 for Yesterday You Said Tomorrow and his second in 2012.

Adjuah released "Live at Newport Stretch Music" a 50 year later nod to trumpet great Miles Davis. The album was also released as a DVD, his first.

In 2017, Adjuah released three albums, collectively titled The Centennial Trilogy. The albums' launch commemorated the 100th anniversary of the first Jazz recordings of 1917. The series is, at its core, a sobering re-evaluation of the social-political realities of the world through sound. The three releases include Ruler Rebel, Diaspora, and The Emancipation Procrastination. The third installment of The Centennial Trilogy, The Emancipation Procrastination, was nominated for a 2018 Grammy® Award in the Best Contemporary Instrumental Album.

Discography

As leader 
 2002?: Christian Scott (Impromp2, 2003)
 2005: Rewind That (Concord Jazz, 2006)
 2007: Anthem (Concord Jazz, 2007)
 2001–04: Two of a Kind with Donald Harrison (Nagel Heyer, 2008)
 2008: Live at Newport (Concord Jazz, 2008) – live
 2009: Yesterday You Said Tomorrow (Concord Jazz, 2010)
 2010: Ninety Miles Project (Concord Jazz, 2011)
 2010: Ninety Miles Live at Cubadisco (Concord Jazz, 2012) – live
 2011: Christian aTunde Adjuah (Concord Jazz, 2012)
 2014: Stretch Music (Ropeadope Records, 2015)
 2016: Diaspora (Ropeadope/Stretch, 2017)
 2016: Ruler Rebel (Ropeadope/Stretch, 2017)
 2016: The Emancipation Procrastination (Ropeadope/Stretch, 2017)
 2018: Ancestral Recall (Ropeadope/Stretch, 2019)
 2020: Axiom (Ropeadope, 2020) – live

As sideman 
With Donald Harrison
 Real Life Stories (Nagel Heyer, 2002) – recorded in 2001
 Kind of New (Candid, 2002)
 Paradise Found (Fomp, 2003)

With others
 Philip Bailey, Love Will Find a Way (Verve, 2019)
 David Benoit, Jazz for Peanuts (Peak, 2008)
 DJ Logic & Jason Miles, Global Noize (Shanachie, 2008)
 Stefon Harris, Ninety Miles Live at Cubadisco (Concord Picante, 2011)
 Boney James, Shine (Concord, 2006)
 Jose James, No Beginning No End 2 (Rainbow Blonde, 2020)
 Ledisi, It's Christmas (Verve Forecast, 2008)
 Harvey Mason, Chameleon (Concord, 2014)
 Marcus Miller, Tutu Revisited (Dreyfus, 2011)
 Melissa Morgan, Until I Met You (Telarc, 2009)
 Akua Naru, The Miner's Canary (Urban Era, 2015)
 Sergio Pamies, Borrachito (Bebyne, 2011)
 Prince, Planet Earth (NPG/Columbia, 2007)
 Soulive, Live at the Blue Note Tokyo (P-Vine, 2010)
 Ben Williams, Coming of Age (Concord Jazz, 2015)

References

External links

    
 
 Performance for NPR's Tiny Desk Concerts

1983 births
Living people
Jazz musicians from New Orleans
American jazz trumpeters
American male trumpeters
Berklee College of Music alumni
Concord Records artists
21st-century trumpeters
21st-century American male musicians
American male jazz musicians
Ropeadope Records artists
Nagel-Heyer Records artists